Kornice is a small village, administratively a part of the town of Litomyšl in the Czech Republic. It is located on the Hlavňov hill (at an elevation of 383 metres above sea level). The town has a population of about 150 inhabitants.

History 

People used to live here from the last ice age. At the end of 12th century are recorded a village named Domašice and a field next to it called Nakorniceh. Domašice was probably in the 13th century moved to the villages current location. Kornice is for the first time mentioned in 1347. It was a part of the domain of Litomyšl until 1848. Kornice was from 1850 administratively a part of Velké Sedliště but since 1898 had its own municipal office. From 1976 it is officially a part of the town Litomyšl.

Sights 

There are two in the Gothic Revival style constructed chapels from 1873 and 1886. The first one is in the village square and the other one in the forest Končiny above an allegedly healing spring.

References 

 History of Kornice (in Czech) http://www.kornice.cz/pics/download/kornice2.3.pdf

Neighbourhoods in the Czech Republic

Villages in Svitavy District
Litomyšl